Vokzalna is a station on Kyiv Metro's Sviatoshynsko-Brovarska Line. The station was opened along with the Metro on 6 November 1960 and is named after Kyiv's Central rail station (Vokzal)

Decoratively the station is reminiscent of the 1950s stations seen in Moscow Metro, particularly VDNKh. To justify the name of a main railway terminal and thus as a gateway to the system and to Kyiv the architects (V.Yezhov, E.Katonyn, V.Skyharov, I.Shemsedinov, A.Dobrovolsky and I.Maslenkov) took a pylon trivault design with bright white marbled pylons and white ceramic tiles on the walls. Lighting comes from square chandeliers suspended from the apex of the vault. The pylons are decorated with bronze medallions depicting the various episodes from Ukrainian and Soviet history (artist O. Mizin); they are planned to be removed due to 2015 decommunization laws.) In the far end of the station is a bronze grill that used to have a large image of Lenin.

The station's round vestibule is part of a larger structure which contains platforms leaving to the commuter trains. On 16 August 2006, the Construction Committee of Kyiv approved plans for a second exit to open on the opposite side of the railway station with access to the southern terminal. The station will also serve as a future transfer to Podilsko-Voskresenska Line, with Vokzalna-II to open in 2015.

References

External links
 metro.kyiv.ua 
 metropoliten.kiev.ua 
 Photo gallery 
 Mirmetro.net - Pictures and description 

Kyiv Metro stations
Railway stations opened in 1960
1960 establishments in Ukraine